Kaman is a surname. Notable people with the surname include:

 Charles Kaman (1919-2011), American aeronautical engineer and manufacturer
 Chris Kaman (born 1982), German-American basketball player
 Kritsada Kaman, Thai footballer
 Rob Kaman (born 1960), Dutch kickboxer

See also
Kamen (surname)